Anthony Ravard (born 28 September 1983) is a French former road bicycle racer, who competed as a professional between 2005 and 2013.

Major results

2004
1st Stage 3 Ruban Granitier Breton
1st Stage 2 Boucles de la Mayenne
6th La Côte Picarde
2005
1st Stage 1 Circuit de la Sarthe
4th GP de Fourmies
2006
9th GP de la Ville de Rennes
10th Nokere Koerse
2008
Tour de Normandie
 1st Stages 2, 3 & 4
 1st Stage 1 Circuit de la Sarthe
 1st, Châteauroux Classic
2nd Boucles du Sud Ardèche
4th Classic Loire Atlantique
4th Paris–Camembert
7th Memorial Samyn
2009
 1st Stage 1 Tour du Poitou-Charentes
2nd Grand Prix de la Somme
 3rd Châteauroux Classic
4th Boucles du Sud Ardèche
2010
Circuit de la Sarthe
1st  Points classification
1st Stages 2a & 4
 1st Stage 2 Tour du Poitou-Charentes
 1st Châteauroux Classic
 1st Paris–Bourges
 3rd Grand Prix de la Somme
4th Memorial Rik Van Steenbergen
9th Route Adélie
2011
 1st  Overall Étoile de Bessèges
 1st  Points classification
 1st Stage 3 Tour du Poitou-Charentes
 1st Châteauroux Classic
 3rd Paris–Brussels
7th Kuurne–Brussels–Kuurne
7th Grand Prix of Aargau Canton
7th Paris–Bourges
8th Grand Prix d'Isbergues
2012
4th Le Samyn

Grand Tour general classification results timeline

References

External links

French male cyclists
1983 births
Living people
Cyclists from Nantes